Aramina is a municipality in the state of São Paulo in Brazil. The population is 5,655 (2020 est.) in an area of 203 km². The elevation is 614 m.

References

Municipalities in São Paulo (state)